The Roman Catholic Diocese of Kalemie–Kirungu is a diocese located in the city of Kalemie–Kirungu  in the Ecclesiastical province of Lubumbashi in the Democratic Republic of the Congo.

History
 January 11, 1887: Established as Apostolic Vicariate of Upper Congo from the Apostolic Vicariate of Tanganyika in Tanzania
 December 26, 1929: Some territory was lost to establish the Apostolic Vicariate of Kivu
 July 11, 1939: Renamed as Apostolic Vicariate of Baudouinville
 January 10, 1952: Some territory was lost to establish the Apostolic Vicariate of Kasongo
 November 10, 1959: Promoted as Diocese of Baudouinville
 April 24, 1971: Some territory was lost to establish the Diocese of Manono
 August 22, 1972: Renamed as Diocese of Kalemie – Kirungu

Bishops

Ordinaries, in reverse chronological order
 Bishops of Kalemie–Kirungu (Latin Rite)
 Bishop Jean-Christophe Amade Aloma, M. Afr. (since 2015.03.31)
 Bishop Dominique Kimpinde Amando (1989.03.31 - 2010.09.15)
 Bishop André Ilunga Kaseba (1979.04.09 – 1988.08.21)
 Bishop Joseph Mulolwa (1972.08.22 – 1978.11.11); see below
 Bishops of Baudouinville (Latin Rite) 
 Bishop Joseph Mulolwa (1966.09.29 – 1972.08.22); see above
 Bishop Urbain Étienne Morlion, M. Afr. (1959.11.10 – 1966.09.29); see below
 Vicars Apostolic of Baudouinville (Latin Rite) 
 Bishop Urbain Étienne Morlion, M. Afr. (1941.09.22 – 1959.11.10); see above
 Bishop Victor Roelens, M. Afr. (1939.07.11 – 1941.09.22); see below
 Vicar Apostolic of Upper Congo (Latin Rite) 
 Bishop Victor Roelens, M. Afr. (1895.03.30 – 1939.07.11); see above

Coadjutor vicars apostolic
Auguste-Léopold Huys, M. Afr. (1909-1938), died (did not succeed to see)
Urbain Etienne Morlion, M. Afr.  (1939-1941)

See also
Roman Catholicism in the Democratic Republic of the Congo

Sources

 GCatholic.org
 Catholic Hierarchy

Kalemie
Roman Catholic dioceses in the Democratic Republic of the Congo
Religious organizations established in 1887
Katanga Province
Roman Catholic dioceses and prelatures established in the 19th century
1887 establishments in the Congo Free State
Roman Catholic Ecclesiastical Province of Lubumbashi